Osinovsky is a rural locality (a settlement) in Verkh-Suyetsky Selsoviet, Suyetsky District, Altai Krai, Russia. The population was 114 as of 2013. There are 7 streets.

Geography 
Osinovsky is located 6 km southwest of Verkh-Suyetka (the district's administrative centre) by road. Beregovoy is the nearest rural locality.

References 

Rural localities in Suyetsky District